Elmore John Leonard Jr. (October 11, 1925August 20, 2013) was an American novelist, short story writer, and screenwriter. His earliest novels, published in the 1950s, were Westerns, but he went on to specialize in crime fiction and suspense thrillers, many of which have been adapted into motion pictures.

Among his best-known works are Get Shorty, Out of Sight, Swag, Hombre, Mr. Majestyk, and Rum Punch (adapted as the film Jackie Brown). Leonard's writings include short stories that became the films 3:10 to Yuma and The Tall T, as well as the FX television series Justified.

Early life and education
Leonard was born in New Orleans, Louisiana, the son of Flora Amelia (née Rive) and Elmore John Leonard. Because his father worked as a site locator for General Motors, the family moved frequently for several years. In 1934, the family settled in Detroit.

He graduated from the University of Detroit Jesuit High School in 1943 and, after being rejected for the Marines for weak eyesight, immediately joined the Navy, where he served with the Seabees for three years in the South Pacific (gaining the nickname "Dutch", after pitcher Dutch Leonard).  Enrolling at the University of Detroit in 1946, he pursued writing more seriously, entering his work in short story contests and submitting it to magazines for publication. He graduated in 1950 with a bachelor's degree in English and philosophy. A year before he graduated, he got a job as a copy writer with Campbell-Ewald Advertising Agency, a position he kept for several years, writing on the side.

Career

Leonard had his first success in 1951 when Argosy published the short story "Trail of the Apaches." During the 1950s and early 1960s, he continued writing Westerns, publishing more than 30 short stories. He wrote his first novel, The Bounty Hunters, in 1953 and followed this with four other novels. His western novels had already begun to show his fondness for culturally diverse outsiders and underdogs. He often developed his characters through dialogue, each defined by means of their speech. For many of his stories he favored Arizona and New Mexico settings. Five of his westerns were turned into major movies before 1972: The Tall T (Randolph Scott), 3:10 to Yuma (Glenn Ford), Hombre (Paul Newman), Valdez Is Coming (Burt Lancaster), and Joe Kidd (Clint Eastwood).

In 1969, his first crime story titled The Big Bounce was published by Gold Medal Books. Leonard was different from the well-known names writing in this genre, such as Raymond Chandler or any of the other famous noir writers – no melodrama and pessimism, but more interested in his characters and in realistic dialogue. The stories were often located in Detroit but apart from his favorite setting he also liked to use South Florida as a setting. LaBrava, a novel set there published in 1983, was also the occasion for a New York Times review, in which Leonard moved from mystery suspense short story writer to novelist. His next book, an Atlantic City gambling story published in 1985 and titled Glitz, was his breakout in the crime genre. It spent 16 weeks on The New York Times Best Seller list. Other crime novels that followed were all bestsellers, as well. In his review of Glitz, Stephen King placed him in the same company as John D. MacDonald, Raymond Chandler and Dashiell Hammett, but Leonard himself felt more influenced by Ernest Hemingway and John Steinbeck.
Leonard believed that his books during the 1980s were becoming more humorous and that he was developing a style that was more free and easy. His own favorites were the Dixie Mafia story Tishomingo Blues from 2002 and Freaky Deaky from 1988 about ex-hippie criminals.
Some characters appear in several novels, including mobster Chili Palmer, bank robber Jack Foley and the U. S. Marshals Carl Webster and Raylan Givens.
His crime books were published amongst others by Fawcett Publications, Bantam Books and Dell Publishing. In the 1980s his publisher was Arbor House, later also William Morrow & Company as an imprint of HarperCollins. There are different reprints of his novels; in the 2000s these included editions from Weidenfeld & Nicolson.
At the time of his death his novels had sold tens of millions of copies.

Among film adaptations of his work are Jackie Brown (starring Pam Grier, directed by Quentin Tarantino) which is a "homage to the author's trademark rhythm and pace"; Get Shorty (1995, John Travolta and Gene Hackman); Out of Sight (1998, George Clooney and Jennifer Lopez, directed by Steven Soderbergh) and the television series Justified. Nearly thirty movies were made from Leonard's novels, but for some critics his special style worked only in print.

Personal life
He married Beverly Clare Cline in 1949, and they had five children together—two daughters and three sons—before divorcing in 1977.  His second marriage in 1979, to Joan Leanne Lancaster (aka Joan Shepard), ended with her death in 1993. Later that same year, he married Christine Kent and they divorced in 2012. Leonard spent the last years of his life with his family in Oakland County, Michigan. He suffered a stroke on July 29, 2013. Initial reports stated that he was recovering, but on August 20, 2013, Leonard passed away at his home in the Detroit suburb of Bloomfield Hills of stroke complications. He was 87 years old. One of Leonard's grandchildren is Alex Leonard, the drummer in the Detroit band Protomartyr.

Writing style
Commended by critics for his gritty realism and strong dialogue, Leonard sometimes took liberties with grammar in the interest of speeding the story along. In his essay "Elmore Leonard's Ten Rules of Writing" he said: "My most important rule is one that sums up the 10: If it sounds like writing, I rewrite it."  He also hinted: "I try to leave out the parts that readers tend to skip."

Elmore Leonard has been called "the Dickens of Detroit" because of his intimate portraits of people from that city, though he said, "If I lived in Buffalo, I'd write about Buffalo."  His favorite epithet was one given by Britain's New Musical Express: "the poet laureate of wild assholes with revolvers". His ear for dialogue has been praised by writers such as Saul Bellow, Martin Amis, and Stephen King. "Your prose makes Raymond Chandler look clumsy," Amis told Leonard at a Writers Guild event in Beverly Hills in 1998. Stephen King has called him "the great American writer." According to Charles Rzepka of Boston University, Leonard's mastery of free indirect discourse, a third-person narrative technique that gives the illusion of immediate access to a character's thoughts, "is unsurpassed in our time, and among the surest of all time, even if we include Jane Austen, Gustave Flaubert, and Hemingway in the mix."

Leonard often cited Ernest Hemingway as perhaps his most important influence, but at the same time criticized Hemingway for his lack of humor and for taking himself too seriously.  Still, it was Leonard's affection for Hemingway, as well as George V. Higgins, that led him to will his personal papers to the University of South Carolina, where many of Hemingway's and Higgins' papers are archived.  Leonard's papers reside at the university's Irvin Department of Rare Books and Special Collections.

Leonard in turn had a very strong influence on a generation of crime writers that followed him. His obituary in USA Today named George Pelecanos, Michael Connelly, Dennis Lehane, and Laura Lippman.

Awards and honors
 1984 Edgar Award for Best Mystery Novel of 1983 for LaBrava.
 1992 Grand Master Award for Lifetime Achievement from the Mystery Writers of America
 2008 F. Scott Fitzgerald Literary Award for outstanding achievement in American literature; received during the 13th Annual F. Scott Fitzgerald Literary Conference held at Montgomery College in Rockville, Maryland, United States.
 2010 Peabody Award, FX's Justified
 2012 National Book Award, Medal for Distinguished Contribution

Works

Novels

Leonard also contributed one chapter (the twelfth of thirteen) to the 1996 Miami Herald parody serial novel Naked Came the Manatee.

Collections

Short stories

Screenplays

Audiobooks
All but three of Leonard's novels have been performed as audiobooks (the exceptions being Escape From Five Shadows {Escape from Five Shadows audiobook published by Harper Audio 2017}, Hombre, and La Brava). Many Leonard works (including The Big Bounce, Be Cool and The Tonto Woman) have been recorded more than once resulting in more than 70 English-language audiobook versions of Leonard novels. Many of these were abridgements, the last of which was Pagan Babies (2000) read by Steve Buscemi. Certain narrators have dominated the Elmore Leonard oeuvre, notably Frank Muller (11 audiobooks), Grover Gardner aka Alexander Adams (7), George Guidall (5), Mark Hammer (5), and Joe Mantegna (5). Other notable Leonard narrators include Liev Schreiber, Neil Patrick Harris, Tom Wopat, Arliss Howard, Joe Morton, Taye Diggs, Brian Dennehy, Bruce Boxleitner, Tom Skerritt, Robert Forster, Dylan Baker, Paul Rudd, Keith Carradine, Ed Asner, Henry Rollins, and Barbara Rosenblatt, the only female narrator of an Leonard work (the story, When the Women Come Out to Dance).

Nonfiction
 10 Rules of Writing (2007)
 Foreword to Walter Mirisch's book I Thought We Were Making Movies, Not History

Adaptations
Twenty-six of Leonard's novels and short stories have been adapted for the screen (19 as motion pictures and another seven as television programs).

Film
Aside from the short stories already noted, a number of Leonard's novels have been adapted as films, including Get Shorty (1990 novel, 1995 film), Out of Sight (1996 novel, 1998 film) and Rum Punch (1992 novel, 1997 film Jackie Brown). The novel 52 Pick-Up was first adapted very loosely into the 1984 film The Ambassador (1984), starring Robert Mitchum and, two years later, under its original title starring Roy Scheider. Leonard has also written several screenplays based on his novels, plus original screenplays such as Joe Kidd (1972). The film Hombre (1967), starring Paul Newman, was an adaptation of Leonard's 1961 eponymous novel. His short story "Three-Ten to Yuma" (March 1953) and novels The Big Bounce (1969) and 52 Pick-Up have each been filmed twice.

Other novels filmed include:
 3:10 to Yuma (1957 film) (with Glenn Ford and Van Heflin)
 Hombre (with Paul Newman)
 Mr. Majestyk (with Charles Bronson)
 Jackie Brown (Pam Grier, Samuel L. Jackson, Robert De Niro) from Rum Punch
 The Big Bounce (1969 film) (with Ryan O'Neal)
 Valdez Is Coming (with Burt Lancaster)
 52 Pick-Up (with Roy Scheider, Ann Margaret)
 Stick (with Burt Reynolds)
 The Moonshine War (with Alan Alda and Patrick McGoohan)
 Last Stand at Saber River (with Tom Selleck)
 Gold Coast (with David Caruso)
 Glitz (with Jimmy Smits)
 The Ambassador (1984 American film) (Robert Mitchum, Rock Hudson, Ellen Burstyn)
 Cat Chaser (with Peter Weller)
 Out of Sight (George Clooney, Jennifer Lopez, Don Cheadle)
 Touch (with Christopher Walken)
 Pronto (with Peter Falk)
 Be Cool (with John Travolta, Harvey Keitel, Uma Thurman)
 The Big Bounce (2004 film) (with Morgan Freeman, Owen Wilson, Gary Sinese)
 Killshot (Diane Lane, Mickey Rourke).
 Get Shorty (with John Travolta, Gene Hackman, Danny Devito)
 Freaky Deaky (with Christian Slater)
 Life of Crime (Jennifer Aniston) (from The Switch)
 3:10 to Yuma (2007 film) (with Christian Bale, Russell Crowe, Peter Fonda)

Quentin Tarantino has optioned the right to adapt Leonard's novel Forty Lashes Less One (1972).

Television
 In 1992, Leonard played himself in a script he wrote and, with actor Paul Lazar dramatizing a scene from the novel Swag, appeared in a humorous television short about his writing process which aired on the Byline Showtime series on Showtime Networks.
 The 2010–15 FX series Justified was based around the popular Leonard character U.S. Marshal Raylan Givens, from the novels Pronto, Riding the Rap, the eponymous Raylan, and the short story "Fire in the Hole".
 The short-lived 1998 TV series Maximum Bob was based on Leonard's 1991 novel of the same name. It aired on ABC for seven episodes and starred Beau Bridges.
 The TV series Karen Sisco (2003–04) starring Carla Gugino was based on the U.S. Marshall character from the film Out of Sight (1998) played by Jennifer Lopez.
 The 2017 Epix series  Get Shorty is based on the novel of the same.

References

External links

 Official website
 
 
 
 The Economist: 31 August 2013 Obituary Elmore Leonard, crime-fiction writer, died on August 20, aged 87
 Elmore Leonard's career
 Elmore Leonard on fantasticfiction.com
 Elmore Leonard Archive at the University of South Carolina Irvin Department of Rare Books and Special Collections.

1925 births
2013 deaths
20th-century American male writers
20th-century American novelists
21st-century American male writers
21st-century American novelists
American Noir writers
American crime fiction writers
American male novelists
American male short story writers
Burials at Greenwood Cemetery (Birmingham, Michigan)
Cartier Diamond Dagger winners
Edgar Award winners
Novelists from Florida
Novelists from Louisiana
Novelists from Michigan
People from Bloomfield Hills, Michigan
Seabees
United States Navy personnel of World War II
United States Navy sailors
University of Detroit Jesuit High School and Academy alumni
University of Detroit Mercy alumni
Western (genre) writers
Writers from Detroit
Writers from New Orleans
Writers of books about writing fiction